Trevor is a 1994 American short film directed by Peggy Rajski, produced by Randy Stone and Peggy Rajski, and written by Celeste Lecesne. Set in 1981, the film follows what happens to 13-year-old Trevor, a Diana Ross fan, when his crush on a schoolmate named Pinky Faraday gets discovered.

In 1995, it tied for an Oscar for Best Short Subject with Franz Kafka's It's a Wonderful Life at the 67th Academy Awards. It won the Teddy Award for Best Short in 1995. In 1998, director Peggy Rajski brought fellow filmmakers Randy Stone and Celeste Lecesne together to found The Trevor Project, a 24/7 crisis and suicide prevention helpline for lesbian, gay, bisexual, transgender and questioning youth.

Plot
In 1981, quirky and outgoing 13-year-old Trevor develops a crush on a boy at his school. Trevor is a fan of singer Diana Ross and wants to dress up as her for Halloween. He also enjoys acting and dancing in school plays. Because of these different interests, Trevor faces discrimination from both his parents and his friends; his parents often try to ignore the fact their son is different, and his friends bully him countless times throughout the school day. Trevor also attends counselling sessions with his parents' priest. Trevor tries to take his life by overdosing on aspirin in his room while listening to Diana Ross, commenting "Everybody at school thinks I'm a gay. It must be showing." His suicide attempt is unsuccessful, and as a result, Trevor finds a new friend in a nurse who tends to him.

Cast
 Brett Barsky as Trevor
 Judy Kain as Trevor's Mom
 John Lizzi as Trevor's Dad
 Jonah Rooney as Pinky Farraday
 Stephen Tobolowsky as Father Jon
 Cory M. Miller as Jack
 Allen Dorane as Walter Stiltman
 Lindsay Pomerantz as Cathy Quinn
 Alicia Anderson as Mary Zapatelli
 Courtney Dornstein as Francine Antoniello

Stage adaptation
The film has been adapted into a stage musical titled Trevor the Musical. The musical's book and lyrics were written by Dan Collins while the music was composed by Julianne Wick Davis. It premiered in previews at the Writers Theatre in Glencoe, Illinois on August 9, 2017. It opened Off Broadway at Stage 42 to rave reviews on November 10, 2021. That same year, RadicalMedia recorded the show for a public release, with Disney+ acquiring the distribution rights and releasing it on June 24, 2022 for Pride Month.

Notes

References

External links
 

1994 films
1994 comedy-drama films
1994 independent films
1994 LGBT-related films
1994 short films
American comedy-drama films
American independent films
American drama short films
American teen LGBT-related films
Films set in 1981
LGBT-related comedy-drama films
American LGBT-related short films
Live Action Short Film Academy Award winners
1990s English-language films
1990s American films
Comedy-drama short films